Cochrane may refer to:

Places

Australia
Cochrane railway station, Sydney, a railway station on the closed Ropes Creek railway line

Canada
 Cochrane, Alberta
 Cochrane Lake, Alberta
 Cochrane District, Ontario
 Cochrane, Ontario, a town within the above district
 Cochrane railway station, the railway station serving Cochrane town
 Unorganized North Cochrane District, an unorganized area within the above district
 Unorganized South East Cochrane District
 Unorganized South West Cochrane District
 Cochrane (electoral district), former Federal electoral district, Ontario
 Cochrane (provincial electoral district), former provincial electoral district in Alberta

Chile
 Cochrane, Chile
 Cochrane Lake 
 Cochrane River

Hong Kong
 Cochrane Street

Malaysia
 Jalan Cochrane, Kuala Lumpur, a road in Kuala Lumpur
 Cochrane MRT station, a mass rapid transit station in Kuala Lumpur

United States
 Cochrane, Wisconsin

Organization
 Cochrane (organisation), a volunteer group formed to review healthcare trials
 Cochrane Library, a database storing the Cochrane Reviews of biomedical trials

Other
 Cochrane (surname), the origin of the name and list of people
 Clan Cochrane, a Scottish clan
 Cochrane Theatre, in London
 Cochrane Defense, a chess defensive approach
 USS Cochrane (DDG-21), an American destroyer
 Chilean ship Cochrane, various Chilean Navy ships
 Zefram Cochrane, a character from Star Trek

See also
 Cochrane Airport (disambiguation)
 Cochrane High School (disambiguation)
 Cochrane station (disambiguation)
 Cochran (disambiguation)